The 2021 Alabama Crimson Tide women's soccer team represented the University of Alabama during the 2021 NCAA Division I women's soccer season. The regular season began on August 19, 2020, and concluded with the SEC Tournament. It was the program's 30th season fielding a women's varsity soccer team. The 2021 season was Wes Hart's 7th year as head coach for the program.

Roster

Matches 
Source:

Pre-season

Regular season

Postseason

SEC Tournament

NCAA Tournament

References 

Alabama Crimson Tide women's soccer
Alabama Crimson Tide
2021 Southeastern Conference women's soccer season
Alabama